El Camino High School is one of two high schools of the Oceanside Unified School District, located at 400 Rancho Del Oro Drive in Oceanside, California. Declared a California Distinguished School in the early 2000s, it was originally named "Oceanside High School East", and officially became El Camino High School in 1976. El Camino's Truax Theatre was built in the early 1980s and houses a large performance venue, an adjacent classroom with stage and large music and drama rooms. It also recently built a new Science and Technology Building and is undergoing constant construction to clean up the campus. El Camino maintains a close athletic rivalry with Oceanside High School. The ECHS mascot is the "Wildcat" and the school colors are brown and gold.

Notable alumni
 Rich Wilkes, screenwriter Airheads, xXx, The Dirt
 Brit Bennett, New York Times best-selling author
 Michael Booker, former NFL player
 Richard Crawford, former NFL player
 Toniu Fonoti, former NFL player, he transferred after his sophomore season
 J.C. Pearson, former NFL player
 Denise Richards, American actress, former fashion model, animal welfare advocate and philanthropist
 Antwain Spann, former NFL player
 Greg Sprink, college basketball player
 Ken Stills, former NFL player
 Toussaint Tyler, former NFL player
 Lisa Van Gemert, American educationalist and author
 Bryant Westbrook, former NFL player
 Dokie Williams, former NFL player

Media attention
In 1986, a group of Christian students found two dozen books on sorcery and satanism in the school's library and asked the Oceanside Unified School District board to ban the volumes. A committee of teachers and administrators assisted by the ACLU San Diego chapter appealed to the First Amendment and the students' request was rejected.

The school drew national media attention in June 2008 for staging a controversial fake car accident, telling students their classmates had died as part of an anti-drunk driving program called "Every 15 Minutes--Extreme". "Many seniors from all walks of life were included in the program to show the wide reach and seriousness of drunk driving" said Greg Vargas one of the dead seniors.

Image gallery

References

High schools in San Diego County, California
Oceanside, California
1975 establishments in California